is a railway station in the town of  Tōei, Kitashitara District, Aichi Prefecture, Japan, operated by Central Japan Railway Company (JR Tōkai).

Lines
Tōei Station is served by the Iida Line, and is located 51.2 kilometers from the starting point of the line at Toyohashi Station.

Station layout
The station has one island platform connected to the station building by a level crossing. The station building has automated ticket machines, TOICA automated turnstiles and is unattended.

Platforms

Adjacent stations

|-
!colspan=5|Central Japan Railway Company

Station history
The station assumed its present name on December 20, 1956. Scheduled freight operations were discontinued from February 1, 1984. Along with its division and privatization of JNR on April 1, 1987, the station came under the control and operation of the Central Japan Railway Company.

Surrounding area
 Tōei town center
 Tōei Municipal Hospital

See also
 List of Railway Stations in Japan

References

External links

Railway stations in Japan opened in 1933
Railway stations in Aichi Prefecture
Iida Line
Stations of Central Japan Railway Company
Tōei, Aichi